The Centre Party (Sp), formerly the Farmer's Party (Bp), is an agrarian political party in Norway.

Ideologically, the Centre Party is positioned in the centre on the political spectrum, it advocates for economic nationalist and protectionist policy to protect Norwegian farmers with toll tariffs, and it supports decentralisation. It was founded in 1920 as the Farmers' Party (Bp) and from its founding until 2000, the Centre Party joined only governments not led by the Labour Party, although it had previously supported a Labour government in the 1930s. This turned around in 2005, when the party joined the red–green coalition government led by the Labour Party. Governments headed by prime ministers from the party include the short-lived Kolstad and Hundseid's Cabinet between 1931 and 1933 and the longer-lasting Borten's Cabinet from 1965 until 1971.

The Centre Party has maintained a hardline stance against Norwegian membership in the European Union, successfully campaigning against Norwegian membership in both the 1972 and 1994 referendums, during which time the party saw record-high election results. Subsequently, the party proposed Norway's withdrawal from the European Economic Area and the Schengen Agreement. In 2017, party deputy leader Ola Borten Moe declared nationalism to be a "positive force".

History 
The party was founded at the national convention of the Norsk Landmandsforbund during 17–19 June 1920, when it was decided by the association to run for the 1921 Norwegian parliamentary election. In 1922, the association was renamed to the Norwegian Agrarian Association and the political activity of the group was separated as the Farmers' Party (Bondepartiet).

During the eight decades since the Centre Party was created as a political faction of a Norwegian agrarian organisation, the party has changed a great deal. Only a few years after its creation, the party broke with its mother organisation and started developing a policy based on decentralisation. The 1930s have in the post-war era been seen as a controversial time in the party's history. This is partly because Vidkun Quisling, who later became the leader of Nasjonal Samling, was Minister of Defence in the Farmers Party Kolstad and Hundseid cabinets from 1931 to 1933. However, Quisling was not a member of the Farmers Party. While there were fascist sympathies among parts of the Farmers Party's electorate, the Farmers Party itself never supported fascism and it was the Farmers' Party that enabled the first stable Labour cabinet in Norway. In 1935, they reached a compromise with the Labour Party which led to the Nygaardsvold Cabinet. In addition, the Farmers' Party was represented in the war-time cabinet by Anders Fjelstad, who served as a consultative councillor of state. Political scientist Trond Nordby argues that the Farmers' Party has been given an undeservably bad reputation from this time and that the party was not really "as dark brown as some claim".

In 1959, the party briefly changed its name to the Norwegian Democratic Party – Democrats (Norsk Folkestyreparti – Demokratene), but it soon had to change the name again due to election technicalities. In June 1959, the name was changed to the current Centre Party. This happened out of the need to attract an additional electorate with the continuing decline of the agrarian share of the population. The party's membership numbers peaked at 70,000 in 1971. From 1927 to 1999, the party published the newspaper Fylket.

In local elections, the party has enjoyed strong support in several small municipalities, where the party has a strong influence. After the 2007 Norwegian local elections, 83 of the mayors in Norway represented the Centre Party. Only the Labour Party had more mayors and the Centre Party had more mayors than any other, relative to party size.

The Centre Party had been a part of both centrist and centre-right coalition governments from 1963 to 2000 and in six governments, one of which were led by a Prime Minister from the party. Since the 2005 Norwegian parliamentary election, the party ran for government together with the Labour Party and the Socialist Left Party as the red–green coalition, with the Centre Party constituting the green part of the alliance. The coalition was successful in winning the majority of the seats in the Storting and negotiations followed with the aim of forming a coalition cabinet led by the Labour Party's leader Jens Stoltenberg. These negotiations succeeded and the Centre Party entered the Second Stoltenberg Cabinet on 17 October 2005 with four ministers. The Red–Greens were re-elected to government in the 2009 Norwegian parliamentary election. It has been argued that the party's ideology moved more towards social democracy at the end of the 1980s.

The party is known for its support of high toll tariffs on foreign cheese and meat called "toll protection" as well as their proposal to shoot all wolves in Norway. However, this has lately been rejected as the party's policy by Sandra Borch, the predator policies spokesperson of the Centre Party, who in an 2020 interview given on the debate program to Dagsnytt 18 on NRK1 stated that "[t]he Centre Party has never proposed to exterminate the wolf. We want substainable management of predators", adding that "[w]hat the Centre Party has been a part of, together with the Liberal Party in a broad agreement in the Storting, is that we will have 4-6 breeding wolf packs in Norway."

The party was also in charge of implementing the Berne Convention on the Conservation of European Wildlife and Natural Habitats in 1986. The Centre Party's Rakel Surlien was Minister of the Environment when Norway ratified the Berne Convention, so that protection of wolves became Norwegian law. The Berne Convention was otherwise adopted by a unanimous Storting, which also included all MPs from the Centre Party.

In late 2012, the Centre Party caused controversy in Norway when it emerged that the party had demanded higher import tariffs on meat and hard cheeses to protect Norwegian farmers from foreign competition. This included increased duties of 429% on lamb, 344% on beef and 277% on all but 14 exempted hard cheeses.

Since the leadership of Trygve Slagsvold Vedum during years in opposition, the party has been described as populist by several sources.

List of party leaders 
 Johan E. Mellbye (1920–1921)
 Kristoffer Høgset (1921–1927)
 Erik Enge (1927–1930)
 Jens Hundseid (1930–1938)
 Nils Trædal (1938–1948)
 Einar Frogner (1948–1954)
 Per Borten (1955–1967)
 John Austrheim (1967–1973)
 Dagfinn Vårvik (1973–1977)
 Gunnar Stålsett (1977–1979)
 Johan J. Jakobsen (1979–1991)
 Anne Enger Lahnstein (1991–1999)
 Odd Roger Enoksen (1999–2003)
 Åslaug Haga (2003–2008)
 Lars Peder Brekk (2008; acting)
 Liv Signe Navarsete (2008–2014)
 Trygve Slagsvold Vedum (2014–present)

Government participation 
Governments led by Centre Party Prime Ministers:
 The Government of Peder Kolstad 1931–1932 (minority government)
 The Government of Jens Hundseid 1932–1933 (minority government)
 The Government of Per Borten 1965–1971 (coalition of Sp, H, KrF and V)

With Prime Ministers from other parties:
 The Government of Lars Korvald (KrF), 1972–1973 (coalition of KrF, Sp and V)
 The second Government of Kåre Willoch (H), 1983–1986 (coalition of H, KrF and Sp)
 The Government of Jan P. Syse (H), 1989–1990, (coalition of H, KrF and Sp)
 The first Government of Kjell Magne Bondevik (KrF), 1997–2000 (minority government coalition of KrF, Sp and V)
 The second Government of Jens Stoltenberg (Ap), 2005–2013 (coalition of Ap, Sp and SV)
 The Government of Jonas Gahr Støre (Ap), since 2021 (minority government coalition of Ap, and Sp)

Electoral results

Notable people
 

Fredmund Sandvik (born 1951), farmers' leader and politician

See also 
 Nordic agrarian parties

Notes

References

External links 

  
 Sp – official English-language information page on the Centre Party's ideology
 Election results for the Centre Party in the 2007 local elections 

 
1920 establishments in Norway
Centrist parties in Norway
Eurosceptic parties in Norway
Nordic agrarian parties
Political parties established in 1920